Ngogwe is a municipality in Buikwe District in the Central Region of Uganda.

Location
The coordinates of Ngogwe are 0°14'34.0"N, 32°59'26.0"E (Latitude:0.242778; Longitude:32.990556).

Points of interest
The following points of interest lie in or near Ngogwe:
 offices of Ngogwe Town Council
 Ngogwe Baskerville Secondary School
 Ngogwe central market
 source of River Sezibwa, located just north of the town
 Mukono–Kyetume–Katosi–Nyenga Road passing through the middle of town

See also
 List of cities and towns in Uganda
 List of roads in Uganda

References

Populated places in Central Region, Uganda
Cities in the Great Rift Valley
Communities located on the Sezibwa River
Buikwe District